Liometopum scudderi is an extinct species of ant in the genus Liometopum. Described by Carpenter in 1930, the fossils of this species are only exclusive to the United States.

References

†
Fossil taxa described in 1930
†
Fossil ant taxa